Cerataltica is a genus of flea beetles in the family Chrysomelidae, containing a single described species, C. insolita.

References

External links

Alticini
Articles created by Qbugbot
Monotypic Chrysomelidae genera